St Catherine's Football Club is an association football club based in Killybegs, County Donegal, Ireland.

The team play in the Brian McCormick Sports Premier Division, the first tier of the Donegal Junior League.

Their most famous former player is Séamus Coleman, who went on to play for League of Ireland side Sligo Rovers, transferred to English Premier League side Everton and took over as captain of the Republic of Ireland national football team during the UEFA Euro 2016 final tournament in France.

Notable players

 Manus Boyle — as a Gaelic footballer won the 1992 All-Ireland Senior Football Championship
 Séamus Coleman — did actually pursue a professional career in association football
 Aaron Doherty — Gaelic footballer for Donegal
 Patrick McBrearty — as a Gaelic footballer won the 2012 All-Ireland Senior Football Championship
 Hugh McFadden — unused substitute as a Gaelic footballer during the 2014 All-Ireland Senior Football Championship Final
 Barry McGowan — as a Gaelic footballer won the 1992 All-Ireland Senior Football Championship
 Ryan McHugh — played as a Gaelic footballer in the 2014 All-Ireland Senior Football Championship Final

References

 
1896 establishments in Ireland
Association football clubs established in 1896
Association football clubs in County Donegal
Sport in Killybegs